"Strong Ones" is a song by Dutch disc jockey and record producer Armin van Buuren. It features vocals from Dutch singer and songwriter Cimo Fränkel. The track was released in the Netherlands by Armind as a digital download on 16 October 2015 as the third single from van Buuren's sixth album Embrace.

Reception 
According to Tim Olsson from webmedia We Rave You, "The brilliant vocals by Cimo Fränkel really stand out in the mixture combined of guitar sounds and the incredible progressive melody and production work of Armin van Buuren."

Music video 
A music video to accompany the release of "Strong Ones" was first released onto YouTube on 23 October 2015. The music video was shot in Portugal.

Track listing 
 Netherlands Digital download 
 "Strong Ones" (Extended Mix) – 4:55

 Netherlands Digital download 
 "Strong Ones" – 3:08
 "Strong Ones" (Extended Mix) – 4:55

 Netherlands Digital download - Remixes 
 "Strong Ones" (Dave Winnel Remix) – 5:22
 "Strong Ones" (Deem Remix) – 4:35
 "Strong Ones" (Möwe Remix) - 5:35

 Netherlands Digital download - Remixes Part II 
 "Strong Ones" (Jase Thirlwall Remix) – 7:30
 "Strong Ones" (Le Visiteur & My Oh My Mix) – 5:55

Charts

References 

2015 singles
2015 songs
Armin van Buuren songs
Songs written by Armin van Buuren
Songs written by Benno de Goeij
Songs written by Sebastian Thott
Armada Music singles